38th Street may refer to:

Places in the United States 
Phoenix, Arizona
38th Street/Washington station
Minneapolis, Minnesota
38th Street (Minneapolis)
38th Street (Metro Transit station)

New York City, New York
38th Street (IRT Sixth Avenue Line)
38th Street (Manhattan)

Organizations 

 38th Street gang, organization based in the U.S. state of California